The Assumption of the Blessed Virgin Mary Cathedral  also called Cathedral of the Blessed Virgin Mary is the name given to a religious building belonging to the Catholic Church and is located in the city of Odesa in the southwest part of the European country of Ukraine.

The temple follows the Roman or Latin rite and was built between 1844 and 1853 thanks to the efforts of Catholics from Poland and Germany and the initiative of Father Grzegorz Razutowicz, designed by Polish architect Feliks Gąsiorowski with the help of Italian architect Francesco Morandi.

The church was built as a three-aisled basilica with a dome selected cruise on a cruciform plan. Inside white and gray marble were used. In the painting of the main altar is an image of the Assumption of the Virgin Mary in 1850 which is a copy of Raphael. The interior is adorned with many valuable paintings and large crystal chandeliers. Pope Pius IX donated to the church in 1852 marble baptismal font. Next to the church is an orphanage, a nursing home, a Catholic school and a shelter for children was built.

Pope Francis granted a Pontifical decree of coronation to the shrines venerated Marian image  on 3 August 2022.  The rite of coronation was executed on August 15 of the same year, the Solemnity of the Assumption.

See also
Roman Catholicism in Ukraine
Assumption Cathedral (disambiguation)

References

Roman Catholic cathedrals in Ukraine
Religious buildings and structures in Odesa
Roman Catholic churches completed in 1853
19th-century Roman Catholic church buildings in Ukraine